The 2003 European Tour was the 32nd season of golf tournaments since the European Tour officially began in 1972.

The season was made up of 45 tournaments counting towards the Order of Merit, which included the four major championships and three World Golf Championships, and three non-counting "Approved Special Events".

The Order of Merit was won for the first time by South African Ernie Els.

Changes for 2003
There were four new tournaments to the European Tour in 2003, the Nordic Open and three dual-ranking events, the Aa St Omer Open, BMW Russian Open and Mallorca Classic. Lost from the tour schedule were the English Open, Great North Open and the dual-ranking North West of Ireland Open.

Schedule
The following table lists official events during the 2003 season.

Unofficial events
The following events were sanctioned by the European Tour, but did not carry official money, nor were wins official.

Order of Merit
The Order of Merit was based on prize money won during the season, calculated in Euros.

Awards

See also
2003 PGA Tour
List of golfers with most European Tour wins

Notelist

References

External links
2003 season results on the PGA European Tour website
2003 Order of Merit on the PGA European Tour website

European Tour seasons
European Tour